Orazio Frezza was an Italian painter of the Baroque period, born and active in Naples,

He was instructed by Giovanni Battista Benaschi. He afterwards studied the works of Giovanni Lanfranco and Domenichino, whom he imitated with some success. He painted for a church in Naples, a Calvary now exhibited in Castel Capuano.

References

17th-century Italian painters
Italian male painters
17th-century Neapolitan people
Painters from Naples
Italian Baroque painters
Year of death unknown
Year of birth unknown